Stratiomys maculosa is a species of soldier fly in the family Stratiomyidae. Sometimes called the spotted soldier fly, it seeks flowers and riparian habitats. The geographic range of this insect is western North America, including British Columbia, Washington, Oregon, Utah, Idaho, Nevada and California.

References

Further reading

External links

 

Stratiomyidae
Articles created by Qbugbot
Insects described in 1866